Thurman Donell Rodgers  (December 1, 1934 – June 9, 2022) was a lieutenant general in the United States Army. His assignments included Commanding General the United States Army Information Systems Command, United States Army Signal Center and Fort Gordon. Rodgers attended the Tennessee Polytechnic Institute, graduating in 1957 with a B.S. degree in electrical engineering. He later earned an M.A. degree in public administration from the University of Northern Colorado.

From March 1979 to April 1981, Rodgers served as commanding officer of the 7th Signal Brigade. In April 1982, he was given command of the U.S. Army Communications Systems Agency at Fort Monmouth, New Jersey, and the U.S. Army Communication-Electronics Engineering Installation Agency at Fort Huachuca, Arizona. In September 1983, he became the commanding officer of the U.S. Army Signal Center and Fort Gordon, as well as commandant of the U.S. Army Signal School, in Augusta, Georgia.

Personal
Rodgers is the son of Lester Donell Rodgers (June 23, 1913 – June 9, 2001) and Johnie Dellard (McBroom) Rodgers (September 20, 1910 – September 8, 2000). He has a sister and two nephews.

Rodgers married Wanda Faye Bohannon (February 7, 1936 – March 3, 1988) on December 28, 1956, in Cookeville, Tennessee. The couple had one son. After her death from a heart attack in Northern Virginia, Faye Rodgers was interred at the Cookeville City Cemetery.

On June 3, 1989, Rodgers remarried with Virginia June (Kent) Scobee, the widow of Space Shuttle Challenger commander Francis Richard "Dick" Scobee, in Arlington County, Virginia. June Scobee Rodgers is a retired university professor.

References

1934 births
2022 deaths
People from Cookeville, Tennessee
Military personnel from Tennessee
Tennessee Technological University alumni
United States Army personnel of the Vietnam War
University of Northern Colorado alumni
Recipients of the Meritorious Service Medal (United States)
Recipients of the Legion of Merit
United States Army generals
Recipients of the Distinguished Service Medal (US Army)